Megalybus is a genus of small-headed flies in the family Acroceridae. It contains three species found in Chile, though two species have also been reported from Neuquén Province of Argentina.

Species
 Megalybus crassus Philippi, 1865
 Megalybus obesus Philippi, 1865
 Megalybus pictus Philippi, 1865

References

Acroceridae
Diptera of South America
Arthropods of Chile
Arthropods of Argentina
Taxa named by Rodolfo Amando Philippi